Showajidaiidae is a family of sea slugs, dorid nudibranchs, marine gastropod mollusks in the superfamily Chromodoridoidea.

Taxonomy 
Genera within the family Showajidaiidae include:
 Showajidaia Korshunova, Fletcher, Picton, Lundin, Kashio, N. Sanamyan, K. Sanamyan, Padula, Schrödl & Martynov, 2020

References

Nudipleura
Nudibranchia
Gastropod families